Mount Vernon is a rural community in Houston County, Texas.  It is located on Highway 7 4 miles from Ratcliff.  By the 1990s only a church, cemetery, and a few houses remain.

Unincorporated communities in Houston County, Texas
Unincorporated communities in Texas